"Cream" is a 1999 single released by Blank & Jones which reached #24 in the UK Charts.

Single 
UK & French Single
"Cream (Extended Version)" - 7:19
"Cream (Paul van Dyk Mix)" - 8:15

Australian & Swedish Single
"Cream (Radio Edit)" - 3:18
"Cream (Paul van Dyk Short Cut)" - 3:41
"Cream (Long Version)" - 7:20
"Cream (ATB Mix)" - 6:11
"Cream (Paul van Dyk Mix)" - 8:18

Spanish & German Single
A1
"Cream (Paul van Dyk Long Version)" - 8:19
A2
"Cream (Paul van Dyk Short Cut)" - 3:41
B1
"Cream (ATB Mix)" - 6:10
B2
"Cream (Long Version)" - 7:20

Charts

Weekly charts

Year-end charts

References

External links 
 Blank and Jones Official Site

1999 singles
1999 songs
Trance songs